George Carpenter (23 September 1908 – 13 August 2005) was an Irish épée fencer. He competed at the 1952 and 1960 Summer Olympics.

References

External links
 

1908 births
2005 deaths
Irish male épée fencers
Olympic fencers of Ireland
Fencers at the 1952 Summer Olympics
Fencers at the 1960 Summer Olympics
20th-century Irish people